Deathrow is a 2000 Philippine crime film co-written and directed by Joel Lamangan. The film stars Cogie Domingo and Eddie Garcia. This is GMA Films' last feature film before entering a 4-year hiatus.

It was one of the entries in the 2000 Metro Manila Film Festival, where it won Best Actor, Best Production Design and Best Film Editing, among others.

Plot
16-year-old Sonny Corpus (Cogie), born and raised in the slums of Manila, frequently hangs out with his friends Celso, Jimmy, and Rodel, who also pressure Sonny to spend more time with them. Unbeknownst to Sonny, his friends plan to rob a house one night. During the robbery, Celso accidentally fires at the owner of the house (Anita Linda), killing her. Police arrive at the scene and Jimmy and Rodel are killed, prompting Sonny to freeze and Celso to run. The police find Sonny at the scene and arrest him.

Sonny is detained and cross-examined, and his lawyer points out that his client is still a minor. However, he fails to show ample evidence. Although Sonny didn't kill anyone during the robbery, he is found guilty of murder and subsequently sentenced to death row. After a harsh introduction to prison life during his struggle to come to terms with the court's verdict, he finds his place among the convicts.

'Mayor' Mio, a fellow inmate who holds a position of power in the prison hierarchy, attempts to recruit Sonny as a dealer for his cocaine smuggling business. Sonny hesitantly accepts. The cocaine business is known to the jail warden Fajardo (Spanky Manikan) who is also an accomplice in the illegal business. Gabino (Pen Medina), Mio's second-in-command, attempts to win Sonny's support as part of his secretive preparations for a coup against Mio.

Fellow inmate Lolo Sinat (Eddie Garcia), a 77-year-old gangster who appears to be the most powerful and senior inmate on death row, eventually takes Sonny under his wings. He advises Sonny to stop his involvement in the drug business. When a high-ranking official visits the prison, Sonny confesses to him about the drug business. Gabino exacts revenge by giving Sonny a severe beating; he is also raped and tortured.

Sonny seeks the help of Gina (Jaclyn Jose), a public attorney who also handles the case of Lolo Sinat, to appeal his case. Lolo Sinat does not trust Gina, often calling her a stupid lawyer; she responds by telling him he does not know how to love. Lolo Sinat tells Sonny about his past and how he was brought to jail. The two become closer, and Lolo Sinat promises Sonny that he will help the boy so that when Lolo Sinat faces God, he could say that for once in his life, he has done something right.

With the help of Lukas (Mon Confiado), Lolo Sinat and Sonny manage to escape, but are caught the next day. Gina then tells Lolo Sinat that his death penalty will be served the next week. With his death drawing near, the old man encourages Gina to help Sonny appeal his case. Gabino tries to rape Sonny again, but the boy fights back with a bread knife and stabs Gabino several times, killing him. Lolo Sinat covers up for Sonny.

Before being brought to the lethal injection chamber, Lolo Sinat gives his old walkman to Sonny.

After several weeks, Gina's appeal for Sonny's case becomes successful. Celso is found and brought to justice and Sonny is released from jail.

Cast
Cogie Domingo as Sonny Corpus
Eddie Garcia as Lolo Sinat
Ray Ventura as 'Mayor' Mio
Pen Medina as Gabino
Jaclyn Jose as Gina 
Angelika dela Cruz as Sabel
Tony Mabesa as 'Governor' Asunta
Spanky Manikan as Fajardo 
Mon Confiado as Lukas
Nonie Buencamino as Nardo
Ace Espinosa as Young Lolo Sinat
Janine Desiderio as Ruby 
Allan Paule as Cenon 
Mel Kimura as Cenon's wife
Jim Pebanco as Lupe 
Maureen Mauricio as Sonny's aunt
Anita Linda as robbery victim
Joseph Izon as Celso 
Marky Alonzo as Rodel 
Randy Ramos as Jimmy 
Richard Quan as Armand
Tessie Villarama as Judge
James Patricks as Sonny's lawyer

Awards and nominations
In the 2000 Metro Manila Film Festival, it won 2nd Best Film, Best Actor (Eddie Garcia), Best Production Design (Joey Luna), Best Film Editing (Jess Navarro and Kelly N. Cruz), Best Sound Recording (Albert Michael Idioma and Rudy Gonzales).

In the FAP Awards, it won Best Actor (Eddie Garcia), Best Editing (Jess Navarro), Best Production Design (Joey Luna) and Best Supporting Actor (Pen Medina).

In the Gawad Urian Awards, it won Best Actor (Eddie Garcia), Best Editing (Jess Navarro and Kelly N. Cruz) and Best Sound (Albert Michael Idioma and Rudy Gonzales).

It was given the Prix Du Meilleur Film Engage au Service d’une Cause (Prize for the Best Committed Film Championing a Cause) at the 23rd International Festival of Independent Films in Brussels, Belgium  in 2001 for its sensitive yet realistic depiction of the plight of a juvenile delinquent on death row.

It was nominated for Golden Cairo Award in the 2001 Cairo International Film Festival. It was shown and competed in other international film festivals.

It was shown at the 2001 Toronto International Film Festival.

References

External links
 

GMA Pictures films
2000 films
Philippine crime drama films
2000s Tagalog-language films
Films about capital punishment
Films directed by Joel Lamangan